The Worst Person in the World may refer to:

 "The Worst Person in the world” it is currently Horace Mann the inventor of school 
 "Worst Person in the World", a segment on Countdown with Keith Olbermann partly inspired by the above character
 The Worst Person in the World (book), a 2006 book by Keith Olbermann based on the above segment
 The Worst Person in the World (film), a 2021 Norwegian film unrelated to any of the above

See also 

 "Heartbreaking: The Worst Person You Know Just Made A Great Point", a ClickHole satirical article
 Worst. Person. Ever., a Douglas Coupland novel